The Homestead Subdivision is a CSX railroad line in South Florida.  Running from a junction with the South Florida Rail Corridor in Hialeah near Miami International Airport south to Homestead, the line is the southernmost railroad line in the continental United States.

Route and operation
The line begins just east of Miami International Airport where it branches off the state-owned South Florida Rail Corridor (CSX's former Miami Subdivision).  The line heads southwest around the airport's Runway 9/27 to Oleander Junction, where the Lehigh Spur to Doral and Sweetwater branches off to the west.  The Florida East Coast Railway's Little River Branch also connects to the Homestead Subdivision at Oleander Junction.

From Oleander Junction, the line heads south into southern Miami-Dade County.  It passes just west of Little Havana and  Coral Gables before reaching Kendall.  In Kendall, the line turns southwest and parallels the Don Shula Expressway.  It later passes the Gold Coast Railroad Museum and passes though Richmond West and Redland before reaching Homestead.  In Homestead, the line turns south and ends at a wye just south of the abandoned Homestead Seaboard Air Line Railway Station.

The line's milepost numbers continue from the South Florida Rail Corridor, though the numbers are subtracted from 1000 for simplicity.

The southern half of the line only sees sporadic freight service, and the southernmost 12 miles of the line (south of the Gold Coast Railroad Museum) are currently out of service.

History

The Homestead Subdivision was originally built in 1927 as the southern extension of the Seaboard-All Florida Railway, a subsidiary of the Seaboard Air Line Railroad.  It was built parallel the now-abandoned southern segment of the Florida East Coast Railway that led up to the Overseas Railroad to Key West.  The line became freight-only after the Seaboard Air Line discontinued passenger service in 1929, the same year as the Wall Street Crash of 1929.

When first built, the north end Homestead Subdivision ran though the middle of what is now Miami International Airport.  Seaboard's Hialeah yard was located at the east end of the current Runway 8R/26L at the time.  Prior to 1949, the airport was actually two separate air fields on either side of the tracks, with Miami Army Airfield to the south and Pan American Field (later known as the 36th Street Airport) to the north.  In 1949, the Dade County Port Authority merged the two air fields and was officially named Miami International Airport.  The Dade County Port Authority paid $3 million to relocate Seaboard's yard further north and to realign the Homestead Subdivision between LeJeune Road and Oleander Junction to its current route south of the airport along the Tamiami Canal.

In 1958, the Lehigh Spur was built from the Homestead Subdivision at Oleander Junction.  It was built to serve a cement plant in western Miami-Dade County built by the Lehigh Portland Cement Company.

In 1967, the Seaboard Air Line Railroad became the Seaboard Coast Line Railroad after merging with its rival, the Atlantic Coast Line Railroad.  In 1980, the Seaboard Coast Line's parent company merged with the Chessie System, creating the CSX Corporation.  The CSX Corporation initially operated the Chessie and Seaboard Systems separately until 1986, when they were merged into CSX Transportation.  

After the abandonment of the adjacent Florida East Coast Railway main line through Florida City in 1989, the Homestead Subdivision became the southernmost railroad track in the continental United States.

There have been proposals in the past to extend Tri-Rail commuter service down the line to Homestead but the idea has never made it past the proposal stage.  

In March 2019, CSX officially classified the southernmost 12 miles of the line as out of service.

See also
 List of CSX Transportation lines

References

CSX Transportation lines
Seaboard Air Line Railroad
Florida railroads